Rolf Valtin (January 4, 1925 – August 1, 2018) was an American soccer forward who was a member of the 1948 U.S. Olympic soccer team. Valtin (then Weigelmesser) fled Hamburg, Germany in 1938 and came to America as a Jewish refugee. During the Second World War, Valtin served in the 16th Regiment of the First Infantry Division as an interrogator, including landing on Omaha Beach during the invasion of Normandy. He died in August 2018 at the age of 93.

Playing career
Valtin attended Swarthmore College where he earned first team All American honors in 1947.  In 1948 he was selected as a member of the American soccer team at the 1948 Summer Olympics.  The United States lost to Italy, 9-0, in the first round.  When the team returned to the United States, it played two games against Israel.  Valtin played in both, a 4-1 victory on October 10, 1948 in which Valtin scored, and a second victory seven days later.  Neither, however, are considered full internationals.  In 1949 Valtin played for the Philadelphia Americans of the American Soccer League.

References

1925 births
2018 deaths
American Soccer League (1933–1983) players
American soccer players
Association football forwards
Footballers at the 1948 Summer Olympics
Olympic soccer players of the United States
Uhrik Truckers players
Recipients of the Silver Star
United States Army personnel of World War II
Jewish emigrants from Nazi Germany to the United States
Ritchie Boys